Giuseppina "Pinuccia" Cirulli (born 19 March 1959, in Rome) is an Italian hurdler. She won three medals, to individual level, at the International athletics competitions.

Biography
She was semifinalist at 1982 European Athletics Championships in Athens, in the 400 m hurdles. At the 1984 Olympic Games in Los Angeles, she reached the semi-finals of the 400 m hurdles. She also ran in the heats of the 4 × 400 m relay, before being replaced by Marisa Masullo for the final. Her personal best, on 400 metres hurdles, is 56"44 set in 1984 in Catania. She has 47 caps in national team from 1975 to 1988.

Olympic results

 # - Italy went on to run 3:30.82 in the final.

National titles
Giuseppina Cirulli has won 13 times the individual national championship.
11 wins in the 400 metres hurdles (1977, 1978, 1979, 1980, 1981, 1982, 1983, 1984, 1985, 1986, 1987)
1 win in the 400 metres indoor (1976)
1 win in the 800 metres indoor (1985)

See also
 Italy national relay team
 Italian all-time lists - 400 metres hurdles

References

External links
 

1959 births
Italian female hurdlers
Living people
Athletes from Rome
Olympic athletes of Italy
Athletes (track and field) at the 1984 Summer Olympics
Mediterranean Games gold medalists for Italy
Mediterranean Games silver medalists for Italy
Athletes (track and field) at the 1983 Mediterranean Games
Athletes (track and field) at the 1987 Mediterranean Games
World Athletics Championships athletes for Italy
Mediterranean Games medalists in athletics